George Ashman may refer to:

George Ashman (footballer, born 1879) (1879–1947), Australian rules footballer for Collingwood
George Ashman (footballer, born 1929) (1929–2015), Australian rules footballer for Fitzroy

See also 
 George Ashmun (1804–1870), U.S. Representative from Massachusetts